Greece in the Roman era describes the Roman conquest of Greece, as well as the period of Greek history when Greece was dominated first by the Roman Republic and then by the Roman Empire. 

The Roman era of Greek history began with the Corinthian defeat in the Battle of Corinth in 146 BC. However, before the Achaean War, the Roman Republic had been steadily gaining control of mainland Greece by defeating the Kingdom of Macedon in a series of conflicts known as the Macedonian Wars. The Fourth Macedonian War ended at the Battle of Pydna in 148 BC with the defeat of the Macedonian royal pretender Andriscus.

The definitive Roman occupation of the Greek world was established after the Battle of Actium (31 BC), in which Augustus defeated Cleopatra VII, the Greek Ptolemaic queen of Egypt, and the Roman general Mark Antony, and afterwards conquered Alexandria (30 BC), the last great city of Hellenistic Egypt. The Roman era of Greek history continued with Emperor Constantine the Great's adoption of Byzantium as Nova Roma, the capital city of the Roman Empire; in 330 AD, the city was renamed Constantinople. Afterwards, the Byzantine Empire was the Eastern Roman Empire, including Roman and Greek culture.

Roman Republic

The Greek peninsula fell to the Roman Republic during the Battle of Corinth (146 BC), when Macedonia became a Roman province. Meanwhile, southern Greece also came under Roman hegemony, but some key Greek poleis remained partly autonomous and avoided direct Roman taxation.

In 88 BC, Athens and other Greek city-states revolted against Rome and were suppressed by General Lucius Cornelius Sulla. During the Roman civil wars, Greece was physically and economically devastated until Augustus organised the peninsula as the province of Achaea, in 27 BC. Initially, Rome's conquest of Greece damaged the economy, but it readily recovered under Roman administration in the postwar period. Moreover, the Greek cities in Asia Minor recovered from the Roman conquest more rapidly than the cities of peninsular Greece, which had been much damaged in the war with Sulla.

As an empire, Rome invested resources and rebuilt the cities of Roman Greece, and established Corinth as the capital city of the province of Achaea, and Athens prospered as a cultural hub of philosophy, education and learned knowledge.

Early Roman Empire

Life in Greece continued under the Roman Empire much the same as it had previously. Roman culture was highly influenced by the Greeks; as Horace said, Graecia capta ferum victorem cepit ("Captive Greece captured her rude conqueror"). The epics of Homer inspired the Aeneid of Virgil, and authors such as Seneca the Younger wrote using Greek styles. Some Roman nobles regarded the Greeks as backwards and petty, but many others embraced Greek literature and philosophy. The Greek language became a favorite of the educated and elite in Rome, such as Scipio Africanus, who tended to study philosophy and regarded Greek culture and science as an example to be followed.

The Roman Emperor Nero visited Greece in 66 AD, and performed at the Ancient Olympic Games, despite the rules against non-Greek participation. He was honoured with a victory in every contest, and in the following year, he proclaimed the freedom of the Greeks at the Isthmian Games in Corinth, just as Flamininus had over 200 years previously.

Many temples and public buildings were built in Greece by emperors and wealthy Roman nobility, especially in Athens. Julius Caesar began construction of the Roman agora in Athens, which was finished by Augustus. The main gate, the Gate of Athena Archegetis, was dedicated to the patron goddess of Athens, Athena. The Agrippeia was built in the centre of the Ancient Agora of Athens by Marcus Vipsanius Agrippa. Emperor Hadrian was a philhellene who before he became emperor had served as eponymous archon of Athens. He saw himself as an heir to Pericles and made many contributions to Athens. He built the Library of Hadrian in the city and completed the construction of the Temple of Olympian Zeus, some 638 years after its construction had been started by Athenian tyrants but ended because of the belief that building on such a scale would cause hubris. The Athenians built the Arch of Hadrian to honor Emperor Hadrian. The side of the arch facing the Athenian agora and the Acropolis had an inscription stating, "This is Athens, the ancient city of Theseus." The side facing the Temple of Zeus and the 'new city' (this was still part of the ancient city; e.g. the Panathenaic Stadium has always been on that side) had an inscription stating, "This is the city of Hadrian, and not of Theseus". Adrianou (Hadrian Street) exists to this day, leading from the arch to the Ancient Agora.

The Pax Romana was the longest period of peace in Greek history, and Greece became a major crossroads of maritime trade between Rome and the Greek speaking eastern half of the empire. The Greek language served as a lingua franca in the eastern provinces and in Italy, and many Greek intellectuals such as Galen would perform most of their work in Rome.

During this time, Greece and much of the rest of the Roman east came under the influence of Early Christianity. The apostle Paul of Tarsus preached in Philippi, Corinth and Athens, and Greece soon became one of the most highly Christianized areas of the empire.

Later Roman Empire

During the 2nd and 3rd centuries, Greece was divided into provinces including Achaea, Macedonia, Epirus and Thrace. During the reign of Diocletian in the late 3rd century, Moesia was organized as a diocese, and was ruled by Galerius. Under Constantine (who professed Christianity) Greece was part of the prefectures of Macedonia and Thrace. Theodosius divided the prefecture of Macedonia into the provinces of Creta, Achaea, Thessalia, Epirus Vetus, Epirus Nova, and Macedonia. The Aegean islands formed the province of Insulae in the Diocese of Asia.

Greece faced invasions from the Heruli, Goths, and Vandals during the reign of Romulus Augustulus. Stilicho, who pretended he was a regent for Arcadius, evacuated Thessaly when the Visigoths invaded in the late 4th century. Arcadius' chief advisor Eutropius allowed Alaric to enter Greece, and he looted Athens, Corinth and the Peloponnese. Stilicho eventually drove him out around 397 AD and Alaric was made magister militum in Illyricum. Eventually, Alaric and the Goths migrated to Italy, sacked Rome in 410, and built the Visigothic Kingdom in Iberia, which lasted until 711 with the advent of the Arabs.

Greece remained part of and became the center of the remaining relatively cohesive and robust eastern half of the Roman Empire, the Eastern Roman Empire (now historiographically referred to as the Byzantine Empire), for nearly a thousand more years after the Fall of Rome, the city which once conquered it. 

Contrary to outdated visions of Late Antiquity, the Greek peninsula was most likely one of the most prosperous regions of the Roman Empire. Older scenarios of poverty, depopulation, barbarian destruction, and civil decay have been revised in light of recent archaeological discoveries. In fact, the polis, as an institution, appears to have remained prosperous until at least the 6th century. Contemporary texts such as Hierocles' Syndekmos affirm that late antiquity Greece was highly urbanised and contained approximately eighty cities. This view of extreme prosperity is widely accepted today, and it is assumed between the 4th and 7th centuries AD, Greece may have been one of the most economically active regions in the eastern Mediterranean. 

The Roman emperor Heraclius in the early 7th century changed the empire’s official language from Latin to Greek. As the eastern half of the Mediterranean has always been predominantly Greek, the eastern half of the Roman Empire gradually became Hellenized following the fall of the Latin western half. Over the course of the following centuries, mainland Greece was mainly contested between the Roman and Bulgarian Empires, and suffered from invasions by Slavic tribes and Normans. Crete and Cyprus were contested between the Romans and Arabs and were later taken by the Crusaders who, following the Sack of Constantinople in 1204, established the Latin Empire in Thrace and Greece. The Romans retook Constantinople and re-established control in most of the Greek peninsula, although Epirus would remain an independent splinter state until the early 14th century when Roman control was re-established. As a civil war raged within the empire, the Serbian Empire took the opportunity to conquer most of mainland Greece, while a resurgent Bulgarian Empire invaded from the north. In the century that followed, the Ottoman Empire would establish its dominance in the region, annexing all three empires and finishing its conquest of Greece with the fall of the Morea in 1460.

References

Sources
 
Boardman, John The Oxford History of Greece & the Hellenistic World 2nd Edition Oxford University Press, 1988. 
Rothaus, Richard M. Corinth: The First City of Greece. Brill, 2000. 
Francis, Jane E. and Anna Kouremenos Roman Crete: New Perspectives. Oxford: Oxbow, 2016. 
 Kouremenos, Anna The Province of Achaea in the 2nd Century CE: The Past Present. London and New York: Routledge, 2022.

External links 

 Roman Greece paying full attention to the archaeological evidence

 
Greece